Inri de Jesús Manzo Gonzaga (born March 4, 1991, in Veracruz City, Veracruz) is a Mexican professional footballer who plays as a midfielder was previously under contract at Veracruz. After playing for Albinegros de Orizaba he signed with San Pedro Pirates FC of Belize. Manzo played for Belmopan Bandits in 2018.

Footnotes

External links

Living people
1991 births
People from Veracruz (city)
Mexican footballers
Association football midfielders
San Pedro Pirates FC players
C.D. Veracruz footballers